Brugg AG railway station serves the municipality of Brugg, in the canton of Aargau, Switzerland.  Opened in 1856, it is owned and operated by Swiss Federal Railways.

The station forms the junction between the Baden–Aarau railway, part of the original line between Zurich and Olten, the Bözberg railway line, which links Basel SBB with Brugg, and the Brugg–Hendschiken line, which links Brugg with Rotkreuz.

Location
Brugg railway station is situated at the intersection between the Aarauerstrasse and the Bahnhofstrasse, at the south eastern edge of the town centre.

On construction, the site of the station was part of the neighboring municipality Windisch and only sold to Brugg in 1863.

Services
The following services stop at Brugg AG:

 Aargau S-Bahn:
 : half-hourly service between Aarau and Turgi, with every other train continuing from Aarau to Sursee.

See also
*History of rail transport in Switzerland
Rail transport in Switzerland

Notes

References

External links

Railway stations in Switzerland opened in 1856
Railway station
Railway stations in the canton of Aargau
Swiss Federal Railways stations